Ganesh Parajuli is a Nepalese politician and member of the Rastriya Swatantra Party. He was elected in 2022 from Kathmandu 7 to the House of Representatives.

See also 
 Rastriya Swatantra Party

References

Living people
Rastriya Swatantra Party politicians
Nepal MPs 2022–present
1979 births